The Institute of Certified Public Accountants of Kenya (ICPAK) is a professional body for certified public accountants (CPAs) in Kenya. ICPAK is a full member of the International Federation of Accountants and the Pan African Federation of Accounting.

Overview 
The Institute of Certified Public Accountants of Kenya (ICPAK) was established in 1978 by the laws of Kenya under CAP 531 to regulate the activities of all Certified Public Accountants by ensuring credibility, professionalism and accountability in the accounting profession in Kenya. ICPAK members are employed across all sectors on the Kenyan economy and abroad. ICPAK has also been known for disciplining members' who act in a manner deemed unprofessional by the body.

Membership and designation 
Students who have successfully completed the Kenya Accountants and Secretaries National Examinations Board (KASNEB) CPA examination qualify to apply for ICPAK membership. Once membership is approved members can use the designatory CPA-K (Certified Public Accountant Kenya).

Governance 
ICPAK is governed by a twelve-person council is chaired by George Mokua as the National Chairman and Dr Grace Kamau (PhD) as acting CEO.

KCA University 
ICPAK founded Kenya College of Accountancy (KCA) in May 1989 to improve the quality of accountancy and financial management training in the country. The college applied to the Commission for Higher Education (CHE) for university status in the year 2000 and received a Letter of Interim Authority (LIA) on 26 July 2007 to operate as a university. The institution's name was thus changed to KCA University.

KCA University shares it main campus with the ICPAK headquarters and maintains satellite colleges under the School of Professional Programmes in Githunguri, Kericho, Eldoret, Kisumu and Kitengela.

References 

Professional associations based in Kenya
Organisations based in Nairobi
Organizations established in 1978
1978 establishments in Kenya
Member bodies of the International Federation of Accountants